Kolja Pusch (born 12 February 1993) is a German professional footballer who plays as a midfielder for MSV Duisburg.

Career
Having come through the Bayer 04 Leverkusen youth ranks, Pusch played for the club's reserves and Chemnitzer FC before joining SSV Jahn Regensburg. In the 2016–17 season, he achieved promotion to the 2. Bundesliga with the club, contributing 31 appearances in which scored six goals and made seven assists.

In June 2016, Pusch chose not to extend his contract but to leave the club and sign a contract until 2020 with 1. FC Heidenheim.

On 2 September 2019, Admira Wacker announced the signing of Pusch.

After moving to KFC Uerdingen for the 2020–21 season, he joined MSV Duisburg the year after.

Career statistics

References

External links
 
 

1993 births
Living people
Sportspeople from Wuppertal
Association football midfielders
German footballers
Germany youth international footballers
Bayer 04 Leverkusen II players
Bayer 04 Leverkusen players
Chemnitzer FC players
SSV Jahn Regensburg players
SSV Jahn Regensburg II players
1. FC Heidenheim players
FC Admira Wacker Mödling players
KFC Uerdingen 05 players
MSV Duisburg players
2. Bundesliga players
3. Liga players
Regionalliga players
Oberliga (football) players
Austrian Football Bundesliga players
Footballers from North Rhine-Westphalia
German expatriate footballers
Expatriate footballers in Austria
German expatriate sportspeople in Austria
21st-century German people